Falkenbergs Fotbollsförening, also known simply as Falkenbergs FF, Falkenberg or (especially locally) FFF,  is a Swedish football club based in Falkenberg. Formed on 3 January 1928, the club plays in the third highest Swedish league, Ettan Fotboll. Falkenberg are affiliated with Hallands Fotbollförbund.

History

During the first thirty seasons of Falkenbergs FF, the club spent most of its time in Division 3. In the early years, the club also played bandy and handball.

In the early seventies (1973 and 1974), FFF were in Division 6. However, they would then start ascending in the Swedish league system, earning two consecutive promotions in 1986, Division 3 to Division 2, and 1987, to Division 1. 1988 was Falkenbergs first season at the second highest level of Swedish football.

After twelve rounds of play in 1998, Falkenbergs FF led Division 1 Södra and had their sights set on qualifying for Allsvenskan. But the club's success would not last all 26 rounds and they finished seventh in the league table.

Season to season

Players

First-team squad

Out on loan

Managers

 Thure Claesson (1929–31)
 Henning Svensson (1932–33)
 Tobbi Svenson (1934–46)
 Erik Göransson (1947)
 Henry Antfors (1948–50)
 Nils Rydell (1951)
 Gösta Lambertsson (1952)
 Tobbi Svenson (1953–54)
 Gunnar Rydberg & Axel Löfgren (1955)
 Gunnar Rydberg (1956)
 John Vikdahl (1957–58)
 Rune Ludvigsson & Fingal Mårtensson (1959)
 Ingemar Pettersson (1960)
 Gunnar Svensson (1961–63)
 Rolf Johansson (1964–65)
 Gunnar Svensson (1966–67)
 Hans Ambrosius (1968)
 Alf Jönsson (1969–70)
 Ove Bernhard & Rolf Jakobsson (1971–72)
 Hans Ambrosius (1973)
 Lars Nylander (1974–76)
 Jan Anders Andersson (1977–79)
 Bengt Carnelid (1980–81)
 Hasse Selander (1982–84)
 PG Skoglund (1985–86)
 Olle Kristenson (1987–89)
 Bryan King (1990–91)
 Stig Kristensson (1992–96)
 Rutger Backe & Sven Sjöholm (1997)
 Roberto Jakobsson (1997–99)
 Uno Andersson (2000–01)
 Örjan Glans (2002–03)
 Lars Borgström (2004)
 Stig Kristensson (2004–07)
 Thomas Askebrand (2008–12)
 Hans Eklund (2013)
 Henrik Larsson (2014)
 Hans Eklund (2015–)

Achievements

League
 Superettan:
 Winners (1): 2013

Footnotes

References

External links

 Falkenbergs FF – official site
 Svenskafans.com – Supporter site (Swedish)

 
Football clubs in Halland County
Sport in Falkenberg
Defunct bandy clubs in Sweden
Association football clubs established in 1928
Bandy clubs established in 1928
1928 establishments in Sweden